Umar Nissar (born 2 May 1993) is an Indian cricketer who plays for Jammu and Kashmir. He made his first-class debut on 1 December 2015 in the 2015–16 Ranji Trophy. He made his List A debut for Jammu and Kashmir in the 2017–18 Vijay Hazare Trophy on 6 February 2018.

References

External links
 

1993 births
Living people
Indian cricketers
Jammu and Kashmir cricketers
People from Baramulla